In baseball, completing the cycle is the accomplishment of hitting a single, a double, a triple, and a home run in the same game. In terms of frequency, the cycle is roughly as common as a no-hitter; Baseball Digest calls it "one of the rarest feats in baseball". Collecting the hits in the listed order is known as a "natural cycle".

The cycle itself is semi-rare in Major League Baseball (MLB), having occurred a total of 339 times, starting with Curry Foley in 1882, through Nolan Arenado of the St. Louis Cardinals on July 1, 2022. Only one current team in MLB has never had a player hit for the cycle: the Miami Marlins. A natural cycle has been completed 14 times in modern MLB history, most recently by Gary Matthews Jr. of the Texas Rangers in 2006.

Notable accomplishments

The most cycles hit by a single player in MLB is three, accomplished by six players; John Reilly was the first to hit a third when he completed the cycle on August 6, 1890, after hitting his first two in a week (September 12 and 19, 1883) for the Cincinnati Reds. Bob Meusel became the second man to complete three cycles, playing for the New York Yankees; his first occurred on May 7, 1921, the next on July 3, 1922, and his final cycle on July 26, 1928. Babe Herman accomplished the feat for two different teams—the Brooklyn Robins (May 18 and July 24, 1931) and the Chicago Cubs (September 30, 1933). Adrián Beltré cycled first for the Seattle Mariners (September 1, 2008) before cycling twice as a member of the Texas Rangers (August 24, 2012 and August 3, 2015). Beltré is the only player to have completed all three cycles in the same ballpark, with the first occurring as an opponent of the Texas Rangers at Globe Life Park in Arlington. Trea Turner hit his third career cycle on June 30, 2021, against the Tampa Bay Rays; his first two cycles were hit against the Colorado Rockies. Christian Yelich hit his third cycle on May 11, 2022, against the Cincinnati Reds, becoming the first player to have all three cycles come against one team.

The most cycles hit in a single major league season is eight, which has occurred twice: first in the 1933 season, and then again in the 2009 season; all eight cycles in each of those seasons were hit by different players. Cycles have occurred on the same day twice in MLB history: on September 17, 1920, hit by Bobby Veach of the Detroit Tigers and George Burns of the New York Giants; and again on September 1, 2008, when the Arizona Diamondbacks' Stephen Drew and the Seattle Mariners' Adrián Beltré each completed the four-hit group. Conversely, the longest period of time between two players hitting for the cycle was five years, one month, and ten days, a drought lasting from Bill Joyce cycle in 1896 to Harry Davis in 1901. Three players—John Olerud, Bob Watson and Michael Cuddyer—have hit for the cycle in both the National and American Leagues. Three family pairs have hit for the cycle: father and son Gary and Daryle Ward, who accomplished the feat in 1980 and 2004, respectively; grandfather and grandson Gus and David Bell, in 1951 and 2004; and father and son Craig and Cavan Biggio, in 2002 and 2019.

Dave Winfield and Mel Ott are the oldest and youngest players to hit for the cycle, at ages 39 and 20, respectively. Of multiple-cycle hitters, John Reilly holds the record for the shortest time between cycles (seven days), while Aaron Hill holds the record since the formation of the American League, with his two 2012 feats coming within an 11-day span. Conversely, George Brett's two cycles came 11 years and 58 days apart. Christian Yelich is the only player to hit for the cycle twice in one season against the same team, doing so 20 days apart against the Cincinnati Reds in 2018. On October 8, 2018, Brock Holt of the Boston Red Sox hit for the cycle against the New York Yankees in Game 3 of the American League Division Series; it was the first cycle in MLB postseason history. In a regular-season game on September 19, 2021, Eddie Rosario of the Atlanta Braves collected his cycle on just five pitches, the smallest number since at least 1900.

Cycles by player

Cycles by franchise

Bold text indicates the current name of an active MLB franchise; normal text indicates prior team names or defunct franchises. Teams are listed only as major league squads; minor league teams promoted into MLB do not have minor league names or tenures listed. Table sorting is by larger number of cycles hit by each franchise, and then if tied, by smaller number of cycles allowed. Only one current MLB team has never had a player hit for the cycle, the Miami Marlins.

Notes
The Milwaukee Brewers were members of the American League through the 1997 season. The team then switched leagues due to an expansion-driven realignment of Major League Baseball's divisions. The Brewers have been members of the National League since 1998.
The Houston Astros were members of the National League through the 2012 season. As part of the franchise's sale agreement, the team then switched leagues to create divisional balance. The Astros have been members of the American League since 2013.

See also

List of Nippon Professional Baseball players to hit for the cycle – the Japanese equivalent

References

External links
Cycle records at MLB.com
Cycle records at Retrosheet
Cycle records at Baseball Almanac

Cycle